Surjo Tumi Sathi (English: Sun, You Are My Companion) is the first novel by Ahmed Sofa. It was published in 1967.

Synopsis 
The story of the novel revolves around a village in Chittagong. Hashim, son of a converted Muslim father Harimohon has been through oppression for his whole life. He hardly supports his family. Kholu Matobbor, the source of power and oppression of the village controls the whole village. Communal behavior village people has been shown very cruelly in this novel. Hashim's grandmother cannot visit him freely because of difference in religion. However, after Sufia's death humanity wins since his grandmother finds her deserted child's reflection in Hashim's baby.

Characters 
 Hashim, central character
 Sufia, Hashim'w wife
 Kholu Matobbor, tyrannical character
and many more

Reception 
The book was written in 1964-65 and in the year 1967 it was published. Sofa himself considered it to be his masterpiece. Professor Abul Fazal said about this novel, “This much artistic maturity at such a young age is beyond my imagination.”

References 

Bangladeshi novels
Bengali-language novels
1967 novels